Merevale is a small village and civil parish in the North Warwickshire district of the county of Warwickshire in England. Located about one and a half miles west of Atherstone, it is the site of a medieval Cistercian Abbey (founded in 1148) and Merevale Hall (built in 1840 and home to the Dugdale family).

Merevale Abbey
An abbey was built in Merevale in 1148 by Robert de Ferrers. It was a relatively small abbey with only around 10 monks. The abbey was dissolved in October 1538, during the reign of Henry VIII and fell into ruin, but traces of it remain to the present day. One of the most significant parts to have survived is the gate chapel, now used as St. Mary The Church of Our Lady Merevale. The church is significant for its Cistercian stained glass, including its Jesse window (one of the most important in the British Isles), and for being the only Cistercian gate chapel to be open for regular weekly services throughout the year. William de Ferrers is buried here.

Merevale Hall 
Designed by Edward Blore, Merevale Hall was completed in 1840 and has been the home of the descendants of Sir William Dugdale since this time. Dugdale  was a strong royalist supporter of King Charles I during the English Civil War, and was appointed as his 'Garter Principal King of Arms'. Many of his artefacts, including ceremonial clothes, can be seen at the hall.

Governance
The village has its own parish called Merevale Civil Parish although for some purposes it is merged to form Bentley and Merevale Civil Parish. The community is served by Bentley and Merevale Parish Council.  Merevale was part of the Atherstone Rural District. In 1974 under the Local Government Act 1972 the Atherstone Rural District became part of the newly formed district of North Warwickshire. Inside North Warwickshire Merevale is part of the Baddesley Ensor and Grendon Ward and is represented by Andy Wright and Bernadette Davey who are both Conservative, Merevale is covered by the Baddesley Ensor Ward in Warwickshire and is also represented by Andy Wright a Conservative Councillor. It is part of the North Warwickshire constituency and the current MP is pro-Brexit Conservative Craig Tracey. Prior to Brexit in 2020 it was part of the West Midlands European Parliament constituency which was represented by 6 MEPs.

Public services
Waste collection services are provided by North Warwickshire Borough Council. Water and sewage services are provided by Severn Trent Water. The distribution network operator for electricity is Central Networks better known as E.ON UK. Merevale has a Coventry (CV) postcode. The postal town is Atherstone which is also the location of the nearest post office. The nearest library is also in Atherstone. Merevale uses the Tamworth 01827 area code. 

The nearest police and fire stations are in Atherstone. Atherstone is part of Warwickshire Police, Warwickshire Fire and Rescue Service and West Midlands Ambulance Service. The village lies in the North Warwickshire NHS trust area. The village does not have its own doctor's surgery or pharmacy. The nearest GP's surgeries can be found in Atherstone. The George Eliot Hospital at Nuneaton is the area's local hospital. It has an Accident and Emergency Department. Out of hours GP services are also based at George Eliot.

Transport
The A5 runs to the east of Merevale. The village has one bus stop on the A5 and is served by routes 48 and 765. The nearest airports are Birmingham and East Midlands.

Media
The local newspapers covering the area are the Tamworth Herald, which has a separate edition for North Warwickshire and the Atherstone Recorder. The local BBC radio station covering the area is BBC Coventry & Warwickshire. Local commercial stations in the area include Free Coventry & Warwickshire and Capital Mid-Counties. The village is covered by the Central ITV and BBC West Midlands TV regions broadcast from the nearby Sutton Coldfield transmitting station.

References

External links 
Merevale and Blyth Estates
History of Merevale Abbey at British History Online
List of English abbeys, priories and friaries serving as parish churches
 

Villages in Warwickshire
Atherstone